Jesper Myrfors (born  in Sweden) is a founding member of Hidden City Games and Clout Fantasy.

Career
He was the original art director for Magic: The Gathering, and several of that game's initial expansions, as well as for the original set of Shadowfist. He also has several game designs to his credit, including the Magic expansion The Dark and The Hills Rise Wild (co-designed by John Scott Tynes). Myrfors graduated from Cornish College of the Arts with a BFA in illustration and is a two-time winner of the GAMA award for graphic design and art direction.

Myrfors lived in Snohomish, Washington, while working as chief creative officer for Hidden City Games, publisher of the game he created in 2005, Clout Fantasy. He later moved to Mercer Island, Washington, where he works as chief creative officer for Aspect Arts Studio.

Roleplaying game credits

Talislanta Fantasy Roleplaying Game, 4th Ed. (2001)
Publisher: Shooting Iron Design   
Credit: Interior Artist
Rage: Warriors of the Apocalypse (Werewolf: The Apocalypse) (1996)   
Publisher: White Wolf           
Credit: Interior Artist
Rapture: The Second Coming (1995)   
Publisher: Quintessential Mercy Studio   
Credit: Interior Artist
The Anarch Cookbook (Vampire: The Masquerade) (1993)   
Publisher: White Wolf   
Credit: Interior Artist
Chicago by Night, 2nd Ed. (Vampire: The Masquerade) (1993)   
Publisher: White Wolf  
Credit: Interior Artist
Knights: Strategies in Motion (Primal Order) (1993)   
Publisher: Wizards of the Coast   
Credit: Production Director
Sentinels (Role Aids) (1993)   
Publisher: Mayfair Games Inc.   
Credit: Interior Artist
Vampire Players Guide, 2nd Ed. (Vampire: The Masquerade) (1993)   
Publisher: White Wolf   
Credit: Interior Artist

Other game credits
Bella Sara 2007
Publisher: Hidden City Entertainment
Clout Fantasy 2005
Publisher: Hidden City Entertainment
Credit:Creator
Magic: The Gathering, 9th Ed. (2005)
Publisher: Wizards of the Coast 
Credit: Original Graphic Design
Magic: The Gathering, 7th Ed. (2001) 
Publisher: Wizards of the Coast
Credit: Original Graphic Design
Ice Age (Magic: The Gathering) (1995) 
Publisher: Wizards of the Coast 
Credit: Art Director and Graphic Design
Rage (1995)
Publisher: White Wolf
Credit: Card ArtSavage Attack (Rage) (1995)
Publisher: White Wolf
Credit: Interior ArtistAntiquities (Magic: The Gathering) (1994) 
Publisher: Wizards of the Coast
Credit: Card Art / Art DirectorEternal Struggle: A Player's Guide to Jyhad (Vampire: The Eternal Struggle) (1994) 
Publisher: White Wolf
Credit: Card TexturesLegends (Magic: The Gathering) (1994) 
Publisher: Wizards of the Coast 
Credit: Card Art / Art DirectorArabian Nights (Magic: The Gathering'') (1993)
Publisher: Wizards of the Coast 
Credit: Card Art / Art Director

References

External links
 
 Hidden City Games
 

1960s births
Board game designers
Fantasy artists
Living people
Role-playing game artists
Swedish speculative fiction artists
Year of birth uncertain